Belvoir is an Australian theatre company based at the Belvoir St Theatre in Sydney, Australia, originally known as Company B. Since 2016 and  its artistic director is Eamon Flack.

The theatre contains a 330-seat Upstairs Theatre and a 80-seat Downstairs Theatre.

The Belvoir company receives government support for its activities from the federal government through the Major Performing Arts Board of the Australia Council for the Arts and the state government through Create NSW.

Many Australian actors who have later found wider success both locally and internationally such as Deborah Mailman, Cate Blanchett, Jacqueline McKenzie, Richard Roxburgh, David Wenham, Toby Schmitz, Judy Davis and Brendan Cowell have appeared in Belvoir productions.

History

Theatre

The theatre, converted from a former tomato sauce factory, opened in 1974 as the Nimrod Theatre for the Nimrod Theatre Company. The first production at the theatre was rock musical The Bacchoi. It was renamed as "'Belvoir St" in 1984 by Sue Hill and Chris Westwood when the building was purchased by a syndicate of people (Belvoir Street Theatre Pty Ltd).

Renovations costing around  commenced in 2005 and were delayed in 2006 with the discovery of asbestos in the building's roof. The theatre reopened in October 2006 with the Sydney season of It Just Stopped by Stephen Sewell.

Formation of the company
Belvoir began, in 1984, when two syndicates were established: "Company A" with shares at $1000 each, which would own the building, and "Company B", with shares at $10 each. Company B aimed to stage theatre productions which were "contemporary, politically sharp, hard-edged Australian theatre; to develop new forms of theatrical expression; work by and about "Aboriginal Australians; work created by women; radical interpretations of the classics and work that is surprising, diverse and passionate.

Company
Belvoir was officially launched in February 1985. Later that year, Signal Driver, written by Patrick White and directed by Neil Armfield, was 'the first play produced from the ground up by Belvoir'. In the lead roles were Kerry Walker and John Gaden. The theatre poster was designed by Martin Sharp. Armfield later recalled that White, who had purchased ten shares in the theatre, was its 'greatest shareholder'.

From its foundation, Belvoir also instituted a "parity pay policy" where all employees, from actors to stage hands, received the same hourly rate of pay. This policy, which continued from 1985 to the end of the 2011 season, prompted former Australian Prime Minister Paul Keating to describe the Belvoir as "Australia’s last commune".

In 2005, Belvoir temporarily moved to the Seymour Centre, Chippendale, while the theatre building underwent an $11.6 million renovation, and returned the following year.

In January 2011, Ralph Myers took over from Neil Armfield as artistic director, stating 'There's a wealth of Australian playwriting and 2500 years of great plays to draw on, I don't see a need to import new plays from overseas.' In July 2014, Myers announced that he would be stepping down from his role at the end of the 2015 season. Myers said he had 'an "ideological" commitment to the regular turnover of artistic directorships'.

Also in 2011, Belvoir appointed Simon Stone as the first director-in-residence. Stone's adaptation of Henrik Ibsen's The Wild Duck, with the Belvoir, went on to win both Helpmann and Sydney Theatre Awards, in 2011, before being taken to Oslo for a three night performance as part of the 2012 International Ibsen Festival. Stone resigned from his position in 2013, and was replaced by dual directors-in-residence Adena Jacobs and Anne-Louise Sarks.

In 2016 Myers was succeeded as artistic director by Eamon Flack. In February 2022 Carissa Licciardello and Hannah Goodwin were appointed directors-in-residence.

In 2019 Belvoir collected an unprecedented thirteen Helpmann Awards, including Best Play, Best New Australian Work and Best Direction of a Play. In the same year actors in Belvoir productions collected Best Female Actor in a Play, Best Female Actor in a Supporting Role in a Play, Best Male Actor in a Play and Best Male Actor in a Supporting Role in a Play.

Shareholders
There are currently 600 shareholders, including noted actors, directors, writers and performers Robyn Archer, Gillian Armstrong, Peter Carey, Judy Davis, Mel Gibson, Max Gillies, Nicole Kidman, Sam Neill, David Williamson, Neil Armfield and Colin Friels. Previous shareholders have also included Joan Sutherland, Ruth Cracknell, Gwen Plumb, Dorothy Hewett, Mike Willesee and Patrick White.

Balnaves Fellowship

The Balnaves Foundation is a private philanthropic organisation founded by media executive Neil Balnaves  in 2006.

In 2011 the Balnaves Foundation established support for two Indigenous-led works per year at Belvoir. It also created the Balnaves Award, which evolved into the Balnaves Fellowship in 2021. The fellowship is awarded to a playwright or director or writer/director, who is given  over 12 months to create a new work, spending two days a week over 10 months as a resident artist at Belvoir.

Past recipients of the award or fellowship include:
 2022 – Dalara Williams
 2021 – Thomas Weatherall
 2020 – Jorjia Gillis
 2019 – Nathan Maynard
 2018 – Kodie Bedford
 2017 – Megan Wilding
 2016 – Ursula Yovich
 2015 – Katie Beckett
 2014 – Leah Purcell
 2013 – Jada Alberts
 2012 – Nakkiah Lui

Seasons

2023

Blue by Thomas Weatherall, directed by Deborah Brown
Into The Woods, music & lyrics by Stephen Sondheim, book by James Lapine, directed by Eamon Flack
Blessed Union by Maeve Marsden, directed by Hannah Goodwin
Scenes From the Climate Era by David Finnigan, directed by Carissa Licciardello
At What Cost? by Nathan Maynard, directed by Isaac Drandic
The Weekend by Sue Smith, based on the book by Charlotte Wood, directed by Sarah Goodes
Miss Peony by Michelle Law, directed by Courtney Stewart
Lady Day at Emerson's Bar & Grill by Lanie Robertson, directed by Mitchell Butel
The Master and Margarita adapted from the Bulgakov by Eamon Flack, directed by Eamon Flack
Robyn Archer: an Australian Songbook devised and performed by Robyn Archer

2022

Black Brass by Mararo Wangai, directed by Matt Edgerton
At What Cost? by Nathan Maynard, directed by Isaac Drandic
Opening Night based on the screenplay by John Cassavetes, adapted & directed by Carissa Licciardello
Wayside Bride by Alana Valentine, directed by Hannah Goodwin & Eamon Flack
Light Shining in Buckinghamshire by Caryl Churchill, directed by Eamon Flack & Hannah Goodwin
Tell Me I'm Here by Veronica Nadine Gleeson, based on the book by Anne Deveson, directed by Leticia Cáceres
Sexual Misconduct of the Middle Classes by Hannah Moscovitch, directed by Petra Kalive
The Jungle and The Sea written and directed by S. Shakthidharan and Eamon Flack
Looking For Alibrandi by Vidya Rajan, based on the book by Melina Marchetta, directed by Stephen Nicolazzo

2021

Fangirls by Yve Blake, directed by Paige Rattray
Stop Girl by Sally Sara, directed by Anne-Louise Sarks
A Room of One's Own by Virginia Woolf, adapted & directed by Carissa Licciardello
The Cherry Orchard by Anton Chekhov, directed by Eamon Flack
Miss Peony by Michelle Law, directed by Courtney Stewart
At What Cost? by Nathan Maynard, directed by Isaac Drandic
The Boomkak Panto by Virginia Gay, directed by Richard Carroll
Light Shining in Buckinghamshire by Caryl Churchill, directed by Eamon Flack
Wayside Bride by Alana Valentine, directed by Hannah Goodwin

(Miss Peony was rehearsed and produced but the season was cancelled due to Covid restrictions. At What Cost?, Light Shining in Buckinghamshire and Wayside Bride were likewise rehearsed but were postponed to the 2022 season.)

2020
Every Brilliant Thing by Duncan Macmillan and Jonny Donahoe, directed by Kate Champion
Jesus Wants Me For a Sunbeam adapted from the Peter Goldsworthy novella by Steve Rodgers, directed by Darren Yap
Dance Nation by Clare Barron, directed by Imara Savage
A Room of One's Own by Virginia Woolf, adapted & directed by Carissa Licciardello
Escaped Alone by Caryl Churchill, directed by Anne-Louise Sarks
The Jungle and The Sea by S. Shakthidharan, directed by Eamon Flack
Miss Peony by Michelle Law, directed by Sarah Giles
My Brilliant Career adapted from the Miles Franklin novel by Kendall Feaver, directed by Kate Champion
Cursed! by Kodie Bedford, directed by Jason Klarwein
Summerfolk by Maxim Gorky, adapted & directed by Eamon Flack

(Note that the outbreak of COVID-19 saw the theatre go dark after two performances of Dance Nation. The season resumed on 16 September with A Room of One's Own, followed by Cursed! and My Brilliant Career, which played into 2021. The productions of Escaped Alone and Summerfolk were cancelled.)

2019
Counting & Cracking by S. Shakthidharan, directed by Eamon Flack
The Wolves by Sarah DeLappe, directed by Jessica Arthur
Every Brilliant Thing by Duncan Macmillan and Jonny Donahoe, directed by Kate Champion
Barbara & The Camp Dogs by Ursula Yovich & Alana Valentine, directed by Leticia Cáceres
Winyanboga Yurringa by Andrea James, directed by Anthea Williams
Things I Know To Be True by Andrew Bovell, directed by Neil Armfield
Life of Galileo by Bertolt Brecht, translated by Tom Wright, directed by Eamon Flack
Fangirls by Yve Blake, directed by Paige Rattray
Packer & Sons by Tommy Murphy, directed by Eamon Flack

2018
My Name Is Jimi, by Jimi Bani, directed by Jimi Bani and Jason Klarwein
My Urrwai, by Ghenoa Gela, directed by Rachael Maza
Mother, by Daniel Keene, directed by Matt Scholten
Single Asian Female, by Michelle Law, directed by Claire Christian
Sami in Paradise, written and directed by Eamon Flack
The Sugar House, by Alana Valentine, directed by Sarah Goodes
Bliss, adapted from the Peter Carey novel by Tom Wright, directed by Matthew Lutton
A Taste of Honey, by Shelagh Delaney, directed by Eamon Flack
Random, by debbie tucker green, directed by Leticia Cáceres
Calamity Jane, adapted from the Charles K. Freeman stage-play by Ronald Hanmer and Phil Park, directed by Richard Carroll
An Enemy of the People, adapted from the Ibsen play by Melissa Reeves, directed by Anne-Louise Sarks
The Dance of Death, by August Strindberg, directed by Judy Davis

2017

Prize Fighter, by Future D. Fidel, directed by Todd MacDonald
Which Way Home, by Katie Beckett, directed by Rachael Maza
Boundless Plains To Share, performed by Tom Ballard
Jasper Jones, revival of the 2016 production
Mark Colvin's Kidney, by Tommy Murphy, directed by David Berthold
The Dog/The Cat, by Lally Katz and Brendan Cowell, directed by Ralph Myers and Anthea Williams
Guru of Chai, by Jacob Rajan and Justin Lewis, directed by Justin Lewis
Mr Burns, by Anne Washburn, directed by Imara Savage
The Rover, by Aphra Behn, directed by Eamon Flack
Hir, by Taylor Mac, directed by Anthea Williams
Ghosts, by Henrik Ibsen, directed by Eamon Flack
The Bookbinder, by Ralph McCubbin Howell, directed by Hannah Smith
Atlantis, by Lally Katz, directed by Rosemary Myers
Barbara & The Camp Dogs, by Alana Valentine and Ursula Yovich, directed by Leticia Cáceres

2016

Jasper Jones, adapted from the Craig Silvey novel by Kate Mulvany, directed by Anne-Louise Sarks
The Blind Giant Is Dancing, by Stephen Sewell, directed by Eamon Flack
The Great Fire, by Kit Brookman, directed by Eamon Flack
The Events, by David Greig, directed by Clare Watson
The Tribe, by Michael Mohammed Ahmad and Janice Muller
Back at the Dojo, by Lally Katz, directed by Chris Kohn
The Drover's Wife, by Leah Purcell, directed by Leticia Cáceres
Twelfth Night, directed by Eamon Flack
Title And Deed, by Will Eno, directed by Jada Alberts
Ruby's Wish, by Holly Austin, Adriano Cappelletta and Jo Turner
Faith Healer, by Brian Friel, directed by Judy Davis
Girl Asleep, by Matthew Whittet, directed by Rosemary Myers

2015

Radiance, by Louis Nowra, directed by Leah Purcell 
Kill the Messenger, by Nakkiah Lui, directed by Anthea Williams
Blue Wizard, by Nick Coyle
Elektra / Orestes, by Jada Alberts and Anne-Louise Sarks, directed by Anne-Louise Sarks
The Wizard of Oz, adapted by Adena Jacobs
Samson, by Julia-Rose Lewis, directed by Kristine Landon-Smith
Mother Courage and Her Children, translated by Michael Gow, directed by Eamon Flack
The Dog / The Cat, by Lally Katz and Brendan Cowell, directed by Ralph Myers
Seventeen, by Matthew Whittet, directed by Anne-Louise Sarks
La Traviata, by Ash Flanders and Declan Greene, directed by Declan Greene
Ivanov, written and directed by Eamon Flack (after Chekhov)
Mortido, by Angela Betzien, directed by Leticia Caceres

2014

Oedipus Schmoedipus, created by Zoe Coombs-Marr, Mish Grigor and Natalie Rose
Once in Royal David’s City, by Michael Gow, directed by Eamon Flack
The Government Inspector, directed by Simon Stone starring Mitchell Butel.
20 Questions, with Wesley Enoch
Cain And Abel, created by Kate Davis and Emma Valente, directed by Emma Valente
Brothers Wreck, by Jada Alberts, directed by Leah Purcell
Hedda Gabler, directed by Adena Jacobs
Nora, by Kit Brookman and Anne-Louise Sarks, directed by Anne-Louise Sarks
Oedipus Rex, directed by Adena Jacobs
The Glass Menagerie, directed by Eamon Flack
Is This Thing On?, by Zoe Coombs-Marr, directed by Kit Brookman and Zoe Coombs-Marr
A Christmas Carol, adapted by Benedict Hardie and Anne-Louise Sarks, directed by Anne-Louise Sarks
Cinderella, by Matthew Whittet, directed by Anthea Williams

2013

Peter Pan, adapted by Tommy Murphy, directed by Ralph Myers
This Heaven, by Nakkiah Lui, directed by Lee Lewis
Cat on a Hot Tin Roof, directed by Simon Stone 
Stories I Want to Tell You in Person, written and performed by Lally Katz, directed by Anne-Louise Sarks
Forget Me Not, by Tom Holloway, directed by Anthea Williams
Angels in America Part One: Millennium Approaches 
Angels in America Part Two: Perestroika, directed by Eamon Flack
Persona, adapted and directed by Adena Jacobs
The Baulkham Hills African Ladies Troupe, written and directed by Ros Horin
Miss Julie, adapted by Simon Stone, directed by Leticia Caceres 
Small and Tired, written and directed by Kit Brookman
Hamlet, directed by Simon Stone 
The Cake Man, by Robert J. Merritt, directed by Kyle J. Morrison
Coranderrk, by Andrea James and Giordano Nanni, directed by Isaac Drandic

2012

 Buried City, by Raimondo Cortese, conceived and directed by Alicia Talbot
 I'm Your Man, creator and director Roslyn Oades
 Thyestes, co-written by Thomas Henning, Chris Ryan, Simon Stone and Mark Winter after Seneca, directed by Simon Stone
 Babyteeth, by Rita Kalnejais, director Eamon Flack
 Every Breath, written and directed by Benedict Andrews
 Food, by Steve Rodgers, directed by Kate Champion and Steve Rodgers
 Strange Interlude, by Simon Stone after Eugene O'Neill, directed by Simon Stone
 Old Man, by Matthew Whittet, directed by Anthea Williams
 Death of a Salesman, by Arthur Miller, directed by Simon Stone 
 Conversation Piece, choreographer and director Lucy Guerin
 Private Lives, by Noël Coward, directed by Ralph Myers starring Toby Schmitz.
 Medea, by Kate Mulvany and Anne-Louise Sarks after Euripides, directed by Anne-Louise Sarks
 Beautiful One Day, created by Paul Dwyer, Eamon Flack, Rachael Maza and David Williams
 Don't Take Your Love To Town, created by Eamon Flack and Leah Purcell, based on the book Don’t Take Your Love to Town by Ruby Langford Ginibi, directed by Leah Purcell

2011

 The Wild Duck, written and directed by Simon Stone, after Henrik Ibsen 
 Jack Charles v the Crown, by Jack Charles and John Romeril, directed by Rachael Maza Long
 Cut, by Duncan Graham, directed by Sarah John
 The Business, based on Vassa Zheleznova by Maxim Gorky, adapted by Jonathan Gavin with Cristabel Sved, directed by Cristabel Sved
 The Kiss, by Anton Chekhov, Kate Chopin, Peter Goldsworthy and Guy de Maupassant, directed by Susanna Dowling
 The Seagull, by Anton Chekhov, directed by Benedict Andrews 
 Neighbourhood Watch, by Lally Katz, directed by Simon Stone
 Windmill Baby, by David Milroy, directed by Kylie Farmer
 Human Interest Story, choreographed by Lucy Guerin
 And They Called Him Mr Glamour, by Gareth Davies, directed by Tom Wright
 Summer of the Seventeenth Doll, by Ray Lawler, directed by Neil Armfield 
 The Dark Room, by Angela Betzien, directed by Leticia Cáceres
 As You Like It, by William Shakespeare, directed by Eamon Flack

2010

 That Face, by Polly Stenham, directed by Lee Lewis
 Love Me Tender, by Tom Holloway, directed by Matthew Lutton
 The Power of Yes, by David Hare, directed by Sam Strong
 Measure for Measure, by William Shakespeare, directed by Benedict Andrews
 Gwen in Purgatory, by Tommy Murphy, directed by Neil Armfield
 Namatjira, by Scott Rankin, directed by Scott Rankin and Wayne Blair
 The Diary of a Madman, by Nikolai Gogol (adapted by David Holman with Neil Armfield and Geoffrey Rush, directed by Armfield)
 The End by Samuel Beckett, directed by Eamon Flack
 The Bougainville Photoplay Project by Paul Dwyer, directed by David Williams

Belvoir education program
The Belvoir's education program for students and teachers includes practical theatre workshops at the theatre or participating school, tours of backstage and behind the scenes areas of the theatre, technical tours led by a professional theatre technician and a Theatre Enrichment Program for "senior English and Drama students in Western Sydney and regional NSW". In addition, Belvoir's Outreach Program partners with local youth support organisations such as Youth Off The Streets, The John Berne School, Twenty10 and Regenesis Youth. Through the Priority Funded Schools Program Belvoir also allows selected students to attend some performances free of charge. Limited student work experience and work placement opportunities are also available.

See also
NSW Philip Parsons Fellowship for Emerging Playwrights, a program formerly offered by Belvoir and Create NSW

References

External links

Theatre companies in Australia
Performing groups established in 1984
Theatre in Sydney
Theatre company production histories